Dioptis leucothyris is a moth of the family Notodontidae first described by Arthur Gardiner Butler in 1876. It is found in Brazil and Peru.

References

Moths described in 1876
Notodontidae of South America